Hygrocybe fuhreri is a mushroom of the waxcap genus Hygrocybe. Described by mycologist Anthony M. Young in 2000, it is found in Australia, where it grows in moss and leaf litter in eucalypt woodland.

See also
List of Hygrocybe species

References

External links

Fungi native to Australia
fuhreri
Fungi described in 2000